Diamond Notch is a wind gap located between West Kill Mountain and Southwest Hunter Mountain in the Catskills of New York. The south side of Diamond Notch drains through Diamond Notch Hollow via Hollow Tree Brook to Stony Clove Creek, thence to Esopus Creek and the Hudson River. Water from the north side also reaches the Hudson, but via a longer route—first the West Kill, then Schoharie Creek to the Mohawk, the Hudson's largest tributary.

References

Mountain passes of New York (state)
Climbing areas of the United States
Catskills
Landforms of Greene County, New York
Wind gaps of New York (state)